Run out is a method of dismissal in cricket, governed by Law 38 of the Laws of Cricket.  
A run out usually occurs when the batters are attempting to run between the wickets, and the fielding team succeed in getting the ball to one wicket before a batter has crossed the crease line near the wicket. The incomplete run the batters were attempting does not count.

Laws
A batter is out run out if, at any time while the ball is in play, no part of their bat or person is grounded behind the popping crease and their wicket is fairly put down by the opposing side.

A batter may be dismissed run out whether or not a run is being attempted, even if the delivery is a no-ball or a wide (i.e. not a fair delivery). There are a number of exceptions to this:
A batter is not run out if they or their bat had been grounded behind the popping crease, but they subsequently leave it to avoid injury, when the wicket is put down.
The non-striker is not run out if the striker hits the ball so as to put down the non-striker's wicket, unless the ball touches a member of the fielding side first.
A batter is not run out if they can be given out stumped.
A batter is not run out if the delivery is a no-ball, they were not attempting to run, and the wicket is put down by the wicket-keeper without another fielder's intervention. This prevents what would be a stumping — were it not a no-ball — being ruled a run out instead.

The batter can be judged run out when they are closest to the end where the wicket has been put down by the opposition. The runs completed before a Run out are still scored by the batter and their team.

The bowler does not get credit for the wicket. The fielder who gathers the ball and either puts down the wicket or makes the ball available for another player to do so is considered the "primary" fielder. Any others who touch the ball, including a player who ultimately puts down the wicket having not been the player to initially gather the ball, are considered "assistant" fielders and are also credited with a run out in statistics.

Run out with runners

If a batter has a runner owing to injury/illness, there is the danger of being run out owing to confusion between the three (or four in very rare circumstances) batters/runners on the field, all of whom must be safe in their crease when the wicket is broken and also at the correct end of the wicket. For example, a batter with a runner should always be behind the crease at the striker's end when in strike and whilst the ball is live. If they leave their crease a
fielder is allowed to break the stumps at the striker's end to run him out – even if they are safely behind the crease at the bowler's end.

A noted example occurred at the conclusion of the final of the Twenty20 Cup in England in 2010 when Hampshire's Daniel Christian, although batting with a runner, left his crease with one run needed from the final delivery.  His opponents Somerset also failed to realise and neglected the opportunity to claim a run out, leaving Hampshire victorious.

Run out not attempting a run

A batter can be run out even when not attempting a run if they are out of their crease and the wicket is put down by a fielder. There is a  trickle of such dismissals even in Test Cricket.

The case has most often occurred when the ball hits the bat or pad, and therefore goes to a close fielder rather than the wicket keeper (direct action by the keeper would make the batter liable to be out stumped instead), and the striker has left their ground to play the ball, or over-balances afterwards, and may for a moment not even realise the fielder has the ball. The fielder may throw down or otherwise break the wicket, or the keeper may receive the throw and put the wicket down.

Some examples are notable for the sharp reactions of the close fielder, whilst some involve lack of due attention by the batter, and approach the humorous. In a Test in Cape Town in 1995, captured on television and widely shared on social media, Shane Thomson of New Zealand played forward and posed elegantly, but just outside his crease. After a short pause, South African captain Hansie Cronje, who was fielding close to the bat, took one step towards the still motionless Thomson, picked up the ball and broke the stumps with an underarm throw. Cronje seemed unsure whether this was within the spirit of the game (the fielding side could have chosen not to appeal, in which case the batter is never out), but was easily reassured by all concerned.

Run out when the batter considers the ball dead 
One issue that occurs more often in lesser, junior and indoor cricket is that, in a quiet moment after a ball has been played, the batter may intentionally leave their crease not attempting a run, for example to talk to the non-striker or to pat the pitch. They can do this because of the customary understanding with the fielding team that the ball is considered dead at that time. If that understanding breaks down a fielder might put down the wicket. As ever, the fielding team must appeal for any dismissal to occur, and the fielding captain will withdraw the appeal if they view it to be unwarranted by the spirit of the game, which will depend on judgement of custom, practice and circumstance. But if an appeal is made, the umpire must give the batter out unless they consider that a dead ball pertained.

Such a clash of custom, or act of pure gamesmanship, occurred in the England vs Australia match at the Oval in 1882, and was carried out by W.G. Grace, who contrived to run out Sammy Jones, which supposedly riled the Australian bowler Fred Spofforth to achieve the bowling performance that won the match and caused the mock cremation that became the Ashes, making it one of the most storied matches in Test cricket history.  In a similar instance in 2006, Muttiah Muralitharan was given run out in a Test match again New Zealand after leaving his crease to congratulate Kumar Sangakkara on completing his century. In a contrasting incident in a Test against India in 2011, on the last delivery before a scheduled break in play, Ian Bell was initially given run out after leaving his crease wrongly assuming a shot had reached the boundary. The appeal was subsequently withdrawn and Bell was allowed to resume his innings after the break.

Running out a batter "backing up"

As a bowler enters their delivery stride, the non-striking batter commonly 'backs up'. This means they leave their popping crease and walks towards the other end of the wicket, so that it will take him less time to reach the other end if they and their batting partner choose to attempt a run. 

Sometimes a batter, whilst backing up, leaves the popping crease before the bowler has actually delivered (released) the ball. Where this has happened, the bowler may legally attempt to run the non-striking batter out in accordance with the Laws of Cricket. If they fail, and the batter has remained within the crease, the delivery is called a dead ball.

Some observers feel that dismissing a batter in this way is poor sporting etiquette and against the spirit of the game, but many others believe that the Laws and regulations exist to be used as a structure of the game and that, as the run out backing up is expressly within the professional regulations, it is legitimate and sporting to exercise the provision, with some drawing analogies to baseball's pickoff.

According to the former convention, a generous bowler may warn a batter to stay in their crease rather than to take their wicket, but this is not required by the Laws of Cricket nor the MCC guidance notes on the Spirit of Cricket. When the run out has happened in first-class cricket, it has on occasion provoked debate. Such dismissals have always occurred and continue to divide opinion.

One of the earliest recorded examples of running out a batter "backing up" came in a match between Eton and Harrow in 1850, when Harrow's Charles Austen-Leigh was run out "backing up" by Eton bowler William Prest.

Vinoo Mankad
The most famous example of this method of dismissal involved the Indian bowler Vinoo Mankad. It occurred during India's tour of Australia on 13 December 1947 in the second Test at Sydney. Mankad ran out Bill Brown when, in the act of delivering the ball, he held on to it and removed the bails with Brown well out of his crease. This was the second time Mankad had dismissed Brown in this fashion on the tour, having already done it in an earlier match against an Australian XI. On that occasion he had warned Brown once before running him out. The Australian press accused Mankad of being unsportsmanlike, although some Australians, including Don Bradman, the Australian captain at the time, defended Mankad's actions. Since this incident, a batter dismissed in this fashion is (informally) said to have been "Mankaded".

In the 21st century 
In all matches played under the Laws of Cricket with no augmented playing conditions, the bowler may, after they have started their run up, but before they would normally have been expected to release the ball, attempt to run out a non-striker who has strayed outside their crease, with no warning mentioned. If the fielding side appeal the umpire will give the batter out run out Under Law 41.16. The previous Laws were more restrictive as to when a bowler could attempt this, but they still allowed an attempt up until a bowler entered their delivery stride, which differed from the international game.

The 2011 ICC Playing Conditions for Test matches, One Day Internationals and Twenty20 Internationals had relaxed the rules on Mankading making it more likely in the International game and other forms of professional cricket including the Indian Premier League (IPL).

According to the various professional playing conditions, 42.11, "The bowler is permitted, before releasing the ball and provided he has not completed their usual delivery swing, to attempt to run out the non-striker." The umpires shall deem the bowler to have completed their delivery swing once their bowling arm passes the normal point of ball release.

In July 2014, England's Jos Buttler was run out by Sri Lanka's Sachithra Senanayake. The World Cricket Council, an independent consultative body of former international captains and umpires, unanimously expressed support of Sri Lanka's actions and a lack of sympathy with the batter. In March 2019, Buttler was dismissed in the same way by Ravichandran Ashwin in the 2019 Indian Premier League. Following the incident, the MCC said that this particular 'Mankading' was not in the "spirit of the game".

In the final game of the 2022 Women's One Day International series between England and India, when England had only one wicket left and required 17 runs to win against India, bowler Deepti Sharma took the winning wicket by stopping in her delivery stride to run out Charlie Dean at the non-striker's end.

The Spirit of Cricket, which is a preamble to the Laws, lists a series of behaviours considered by the cricket community to be unsporting or contrary to the spirit of the game, but dismissing the backing-up non-striker is not mentioned. In March 2022 the MCC announced that, from October 2022, the Law on running out the non-striker would be moved into Law 38 (Run Out) rather than Law 41 (Unfair Play).

References

External links
Stay grounded

Cricket terminology
Cricket laws and regulations
Batting (cricket)